ASTRON is the Netherlands Institute for Radio Astronomy. Its main office is in Dwingeloo in the Dwingelderveld National Park in the province of Drenthe. ASTRON is part of the institutes organization of the Dutch Research Council (NWO).

Goals
ASTRON's main mission is to make discoveries in radio astronomy happen, via the development of new and innovative technologies, the operation of world-class radio astronomy facilities, and the pursuit of fundamental astronomical research. Engineers and astronomers at ASTRON have an outstanding international reputation for novel technology development, and fundamental research in galactic and extra-galactic astronomy. Its main funding comes from NWO.

ASTRON's programme has three principal elements:
The operation of front line observing facilities, including especially the Westerbork Synthesis Radio Telescope and LOFAR,
 The pursuit of fundamental astronomical research using ASTRON facilities, together with a broad range of other telescopes around the world and space-borne instruments (e.g. Spitzer, HST etc.)
A strong technology development programme, encompassing both innovative instrumentation for existing telescopes and the new technologies needed for future facilities.

In addition, ASTRON is active in the international science policy arena and is one of the leaders in the international SKA project. The Square Kilometre Array will be the world's largest and most sensitive radio telescope with a total collecting area of approximately one square kilometre. The SKA will be built in Southern Africa and in Australia. It is a global enterprise bringing together 11 countries from the 5 continents.

Observing facilities

Radio telescopes

ASTRON operates the Westerbork Synthesis Radio Telescope (WSRT), one of the largest radio telescopes in the world.

In addition to its use as a stand-alone radio telescope, the Westerbork array participates in the European Very Long Baseline Interferometry Network (EVN) of radio telescopes.

ASTRON is the host institute for the Joint Institute for VLBI in Europe (JIVE). Its primary task is to operate the EVN MkIV VLBI Data Processor (correlator). JIVE also provides a high-level of support to astronomers and the Telescope Network. ASTRON also hosts the NOVA Optical/ Infrared instrumentation group.

Technology development

Discovery in astronomy goes hand in hand with innovation in technology. ASTRON pursues a proactive programme of technical development, aimed both at providing innovative instrumentation for use on current observing facilities, and at laying the groundwork for future generations of telescopes and signal processing instrumentation.

To these ends, the ASTRON facility in Dwingeloo maintains a well equipped R&D division specializing in the design, prototyping and qualification of:
 Low noise, ambient and cryogenic radio receiver systems (0.2–345 GHz)
 Very high speed digital electronics
 Antennas, especially in the array environment
 Advanced instrumentation for use at optical and infrared wavelengths
 Algorithm and software engineering for instrument control and for imaging

External links

 ASTRON

Astronomy institutes and departments
Organisations based in Drenthe
Research institutes in the Netherlands
Westerveld